Shenzhen, also historically known as Sham Chun, is a major sub-provincial city and one of the special economic zones of China. The city is located on the east bank of the Pearl River estuary on the central coast of southern province of Guangdong, bordering Hong Kong to the south, Dongguan to the north, and Huizhou to the northeast. With a population of 17.56 million as of 2020, Shenzhen is the third most populous city by urban population in China after Shanghai and Beijing. Shenzhen is a global center in technology, research, manufacturing, business and economics, finance, tourism and transportation, and the Port of Shenzhen is the world's fourth busiest container port. Shenzhen is classified as a Large-Port Megacity, the largest type of port-city in the world.

Shenzhen roughly follows the administrative boundaries of Bao'an County, which was established since imperial times. The southern portion of Bao'an County was seized by the British after the Opium Wars and became Hong Kong, while the village of Shenzhen was situated on the border. Due to the completion of a train station that was the last stop on the Mainland Chinese section of the railway between Guangzhou and Kowloon, Shenzhen's economy grew and became a market town and later a city by 1979, absorbing Bao'an County for the next decade.

In the early 1980s, economic reforms introduced by Deng Xiaoping resulted in the city becoming the first special economic zone of China due to its close proximity to Hong Kong, attracting foreign direct investment and migrants searching for opportunities. In thirty years, the city's economy and population boomed and has since emerged as a hub for technology, international trade, and finance. It is the home to the Shenzhen Stock Exchange, one of the largest stock exchanges in the world by market capitalization and the Guangdong Free-Trade Zone. Shenzhen is ranked as an Alpha- (global first-tier) city by the Globalization and World Cities Research Network. Its nominal GDP has surpassed neighboring cities of Guangzhou and Hong Kong and is now among the top ten cities with the largest economies in the world. Shenzhen also has the eighth most competitive and largest financial center in the world, the eighth-most Fortune Global 500 headquarters of any city in the world, fifth-highest number of billionaires of any city in the world, the second largest number of skyscrapers of any city in the world, the 28th largest scientific research output of any city in the world, and several notable educational institutions, such as Shenzhen University, Southern University of Science and Technology, and Shenzhen Technology University.

Due to the city being a leading global technology hub, Shenzhen has been dubbed by media China's Silicon Valley. The city's entrepreneurial, innovative, and competitive-based culture has resulted in the city being home to numerous small-time manufacturers or software companies. Several of these firms became large technology corporations such as phone manufacturer Huawei, holding company Tencent, and drone-maker DJI. Shenzhen's rapid success has resulted in the Chinese government turning Shenzhen into a model city for other cities in China to follow.

Toponymy 
The earliest known recorded mention of the name chen could date from 1410, during the Ming Dynasty. Locals call the drains in paddy fields "Zhen". Shenzhen was named after a deep drain that was located within the area."

History

Prehistory to Ming era 

The oldest evidence of humans in the area on which Shenzhen was established dates back during the mid-Neolithic period. Since then, this area has seen human activity from more than 6,700 years ago, with Shenzhen's historic counties first established 1,700 years ago, and the historic towns of Nantou and Dapeng, which was built on the area that is now Shenzhen, established more than 600 years ago. The Hakka people also have a history in Shenzhen since 300 years ago when they first immigrated.

In 214 BC, when Emperor Qin Shi Huang unified China under the Qin Dynasty, the area went under the jurisdiction of the established Nanhai Commandery, one of the three commanderies that were set up in Lingnan, and was assimilated into Zhongyuan culture. In 331 AD, the Eastern Jin administration split up Nanhai and established a new  (东官郡). The seat of both the commandery and Bao'an County, one of its six counties, was located around the modern town of Nantou. In 590, the Sui administration merged the region back into Nanhai. In 757, the Tang administration renamed the county Dongguan, and moved its seat to what is now Dongguan city, although a military garrison remained.

During the Song Dynasty, Nantou and the surrounding area became an important trade hub for salt and spices in the South China Sea. The area then became known for producing pearls during the Yuan Dynasty. In the early Ming era, Chinese sailors of a fleet would go to a Mazu temple in Chiwan (in present-day Nanshan District) to pray as they go to Nanyang (Southeast Asia). The Battle of Tunmen, when the Ming won a naval battle against invading Portuguese, was fought south of Nantou. In 1573, the Ming administration established Xin'an County, based in Nantou, which had authority over regions that would be Shenzhen and Hong Kong. Xin'an County's economy primarily was based on the production and trade of salt, tea, spices, and rice.

Qing-era to 1940s 
To prevent a rebellion from Ming loyalists under Zheng Chenggong, better known as Koxinga, on the Chinese coast, the recently established Qing administration resettled coastal residents inland and re-organized coastal counties. As a result, Xin'an County lost two-thirds of its territory to the neighboring Dongguan County and was later incorporated into Dongguan in 1669, though Xin'an was restored about 15 years later, in 1684. After the Qing dynasty was defeated by the United Kingdom in the First and Second Opium Wars, Hong Kong Island and the Kowloon Peninsula were separated from Xin'an and ceded to the British in the Treaty of Nanking and the Convention of Peking. On 21 April 1898, the Qing government signed a "Special Article for the Exhibition of Hong Kong's Borders" with the United Kingdom, and leased the New Territories from Xin'an to the United Kingdom for 99 years. Xin'an was briefly occupied by a British force under the command of Henry Arthur Blake, the governor of Hong Kong, for half a year in 1899.

In response to the Wuchang Uprising in 1911, Xin'an residents rebelled against the local Qing administration and successfully overthrew them. In the same year the Chinese section of the Kowloon–Canton Railway (KCR) was opened to the public, and the last stop of the Chinese side, Shenzhen Railway Station, had opened in Shenzhen, helping the town's economy and opened Shenzhen up to the world. In 1913, the Republic of China administration renamed Xin'an County back to Bao'an County to prevent confusion from another county of the same name in Henan Province. During the Canton–Hong Kong strike, the All-China Federation of Trade Unions set up a reception station for strike workers in Hong Kong in Shenzhen. Strike workers were also given pickets and armored vehicles by the strike committee to create a blockade around Hong Kong. In 1931, Chen Jitang and his family established several casinos in Shenzhen, the largest of which being Shumchun Casino. While only in operation until 1936, they significantly increased KCR's passenger traffic to and from Shenzhen.

During World War II, the Japanese occupied Shenzhen and Nantou, forcing the Bao'an County government to relocate to the neighboring Dongguan County. In 1941, the Japanese army tried to cross into Hong Kong through the Lo Wu Bridge in Shenzhen, though this was detonated by the British, preventing the Japanese from entering Hong Kong. When Japan surrendered in September 1945, the Bao'an County government moved back to Nantou.

1950s to 1975 
In 1953, four years after the founding of the People's Republic of China, the Bao'an County government decided to move to Shenzhen, since the town was closer to the KCR and had a larger economy than Nantou. From the 1950s to the end of the 1970s, Shenzhen and the rest of Bao'an County oversaw a huge influx of refugees trying to escape to Hong Kong from the upheavals that were occurring in mainland China, and a range from 100,000 to 560,000 refugees resided in the county.

In January 1978, a Central Inspection Team sent by the State Council investigated and established the issue of creating a foreign trade port in Bao'an County. In May, the investigation team wrote the "Hong Kong and Macao Economic Investigation Report" and proposed to turn Bao'an County and Zhuhai into commodity export bases. In August 1978, the Huiyang District Committee reported to the Provincial Committee on the "Report on the Request for the Change of Bao'an County to Shenzhen". On 18 October, the Standing Committee of the Guangdong Provincial Party Committee decided to change Bao'an County into Bao'an City and to turn it into a medium-level prefecture-level city with a foreign trade base. The Huiyang District Committee and the Bao'an County Committee, however, defended the change to rename Bao'an County to Shenzhen, claiming that people in the world know more about Shenzhen and its port than they know about Bao'an County.

On 23 January 1979, the Guangdong provincial administration and the district of Huiyang announced their proposal to rename Bao'an County to Shenzhen and was approved and put into effect by the State Council on March 5 of that year. Also, the city would establish six districts: Luohu, Nantou, Songgang, Longhua, Longgang and Kuiyong. On 31 January 1979, the Central Committee of the Communist Party approved a plan to establish the Shekou Industrial Zone in Shenzhen with the purpose "to lead domestic, overseas, and diversified operations, industrial and commercial integration, and trading" based on the systems of that of Hong Kong and Macau. The Shekou Industrial Zone project was led by Hong Kong-based China Merchants Group under Yuan Geng's leadership and was to become the first export processing industrial zone in mainland China.

At the beginning of April 1979, the Standing Committee of Guangdong Province discussed and proposed to the Central Committee to set up a "trade cooperation zone" in Shenzhen, Zhuhai, and Shantou. In the same month, the Central Working Conference decided on the "Regulations on Vigorously Developing Foreign Trade to Increase Foreign Exchange Income" and agreed to pilot the first special economic zones (SEZ) in Shenzhen, Zhuhai, Shantou, and Xiamen. In November, Shenzhen was elevated to the status of prefecture-level city at the regional level by the Guangdong provincial administration.

Special Economic Zone (1980s–present) 

In May 1980, the Central Committee designated Shenzhen as the first SEZ in China, which was promoted by then-paramount leader Deng Xiaoping as part of China's "reform and opening-up" reforms which were set up a year previously. Its objective is to be an experimental ground for the practice of market capitalism within a community guided by the ideals of "socialism with Chinese characteristics". On 26 August, the Standing Committee of the National People's Congress (NPC) approved the "Regulations of the Guangdong Special Economic Zone." Under these regulations, Shenzhen formulated a series of preferential policies to attract foreign investment, including business autonomy, taxation, land use, foreign exchange management, product sales, and entry and exit management. Through the processing of incoming materials, compensation trade, joint ventures, cooperative operations, sole proprietorship, and leasing, the city has attracted a large amount of foreign investment and helped popularize and enable rapid development of the SEZ concept.

In March 1981, Shenzhen was promoted to a sub-provincial city. There were plans for Shenzhen to develop its currency, but the plans were shelved due to the risk and the disagreement that a country should not be operating with two currencies. To enforce law and order in the city, the Shenzhen government erected barbed wire and checkpoints between the land borders of the main sections of the SEZ and the SEZ outskirts, as well as the rest of China, in 1983, which was known as the second line border.

In December 1990, under the authority of the China Securities Regulatory Commission, the Shenzhen Stock Exchange was established to provide a platform for centralized securities trading. In February 1992, the Standing Committee of the NPC granted the government of Shenzhen the power to make local laws and regulations. In 1996 and early 1997, the Shenzhen Guesthouse Hotel in Shenzhen was home to the Provisional Legislative Council and Provisional Executive Council of Hong Kong in preparation for the handover of Hong Kong in 1997.
By 2001, as a result of Shenzhen's increasing economic prospects, increasing numbers of migrants from mainland China chose to go to Shenzhen and stay there instead of trying to illegally cross into Hong Kong. There were 9,000 captured border-crossers in 2000, while the same figure was 16,000 in 1991. Around the same time, Shenzhen hosted the second Senior Officials' Meeting of APEC China 2001 on 26 May 2001 in its southern manufacturing center and port. In May 2008, the State Council approved the Shenzhen SEZ to promote Shenzhen's administrative management system, economic system, social field, independent innovation system and mechanism, system and mechanism for opening up and regional cooperation, and resource conservation and environmental friendliness.

On 1 July 2010, the State Council dissolved the "second line," and expanded the Shenzhen SEZ to include all districts, a five-fold increase over its pre-expansion size. On 26 August 2010, on the 30th anniversary of the establishment of the Shenzhen SEZ, the State Council approved the "Overall Development Plan for Qianhai Shenzhen-Hong Kong Modern Service Industry Cooperation Zone." In August 2011, the city hosted the 26th Universiade, an international multi-sport event organized for university athletes. In April 2015, the Shekou Industrial Zone and the Qianhai Zone were integrated within the newly established Guangdong Free-Trade Zone.

On 18 August 2019, the central government in Beijing unveiled reform plans covering economical, social, and political sectors of Shenzhen, intending to have the SEZ be a model city for cities in China and the world to follow.

Geography

Shenzhen is located within the Pearl River Delta, bordering Hong Kong to the south, Huizhou to the north and northeast, Dongguan to the north and northwest. As of the end of 2017, the resident population of Shenzhen was 12,528,300, of which the registered population was 4,472,200, the actual administrative population was over 20 million. It makes up part of the Pearl River Delta built-up area with 44,738,513 inhabitants, spread over 9 municipalities (including Macau). The city is elongated measuring 81.4 kilometers from east to west while the shortest section from north to south is 10.8 kilometers.

Over 160 rivers or channels flow through Shenzhen. There are 24 reservoirs within the city limits with a total capacity of 525 million tonnes. Notable rivers in Shenzhen include the Shenzhen River, Maozhou River and Longgang River.

Shenzhen is surrounded by many islands. Most of them fall under the territory of neighbouring areas such as Hong Kong Special Administrative Region and Huiyang District, Huizhou. But there are several islands under Shenzhen's jurisdiction, such as Nei Lingding Island, Dachan Island (Tai Shan Island), Xiaochan Island, Mazhou, Laishizhou, Zhouzai and Zhouzaitou. (See List of islands in Shenzhen)

Climate
Although Shenzhen is situated about a degree south of the Tropic of Cancer, due to the Siberian anticyclone it has a warm, monsoon-influenced, humid subtropical climate (Köppen Cwa) though it is fairly close to a Tropical one. Winters are mild and relatively dry, due in part to the influence of the South China Sea, and frost is very rare; it begins dry but becomes progressively more humid and overcast. However, fog is most frequent in winter and spring, with 106 days per year reporting some fog. Early spring is the cloudiest time of year, and rainfall begins to dramatically increase in April; the rainy season lasts until late September to early October. The monsoon reaches its peak intensity in the summer months, when the city also experiences very humid, and hot, but moderated, conditions; there are only 2.4 days of + temperatures. The region is prone to torrential rain as well, with 9.7 days that have  or more of rain, and 2.2 days of at least . The latter portion of autumn is dry.

Politics

Structure 

Like virtually all governing institutions in mainland China, Shenzhen has a parallel party-government system, in which the Party Committee Secretary, officially termed the Communist Party of China Shenzhen Municipal Committee Secretary, outranks the Mayor. The party's committee acts as the top policy-formulation body, and is typically composed of 12 members (including the secretary).

Despite being a sub-provincial city, Shenzhen as a SEZ still wields a lot of autonomy from the central government. In addition to being promoted to a sub-provincial city, the National People's Congress (NPC) in 1981 granted legislative powers to Shenzhen and other Special Economic Zones, giving the city the privilege to make its own laws and regulations. The Standing Committee of the NPC also granted Shenzhen voted and passed the "Decision on Authorizing the Shenzhen Municipal People's Congress and its Standing Committee and the Shenzhen Municipal People's Government to respectively formulate laws and regulations for implementation in the Shenzhen Special Economic Zone" in order to give fully strengthen Shenzhen's legislative powers without interference from the central government.

Corruption 
There were several cases of high-ranking Shenzhen officials that were arrested on charges relating to corruption. In December 2002, the Shenzhen People's Intermediate Court sentenced Zhao Yucun, former Commissioner of Shenzhen Customs, to life imprisonment for taking bribes of 9 million RMB. In November 2003, the Guangzhou People's Intermediate Court charged former Shenzhen Deputy Mayor Wang Ju with bribery and abuse of power and sentenced him to 20 years in prison. In June 2005, the Shenzhen People's Intermediate Court charged sentenced Luohu District Public Security Director An Huijun to 15 years in prison for accepting bribes. In May 2011, the Zhengzhou Intermediate Court sentenced former mayor Xu Zongheng to the death penalty with a two-year reprieve for accepting bribes up to US$5.4 million.

Administrative divisions

Shenzhen has direct jurisdiction over nine administrative Districts and one New District:

Shenzhen was originally Bao'an County. On 5 March 1979, the State Council of the People's Republic of China dissolved the county and set up the city of Shenzhen in its place initially with six districts: Luohu, Nantou, Songgang, Longhua, Longgang, and Kuiyong, with the seat based in Luohu. In October 1981, Bao'an County was re-established, with its region now based outside Shenzhen. In June 1983, the districts were dissolved and re-established instead as five management areas: Shekou (south-west Shenzhen), Nantou (west Shenzhen), Shangbu (central Shenzhen), Luohu (east-central Shenzhen), and Shatoujiao (far-east Shenzhen). To enforce law and order in the city, the Shenzhen government erected a border known as the second line, which consisted of barbed wire and checkpoints between the city and the rest of China. Initially, the border control was relatively strict, requiring non-Shenzhen citizens to obtain special permissions for entering. Over the years, border controls have gradually weakened, and permission requirement has been abandoned. 

In January 1990, the city merged Shekou Management Area and Nantou Management Area to form the Nanshan District, renamed Shangbu Management Area to the Futian District, and merged Luohu Management Area and Shatoujiao Management Area to form the Luohu District. In December 1992, Bao'an County was dissolved again, with its area taken by Shenzhen and split into two new districts: Bao'an District and Longgang District, though economic privileges within special economics zones did not pertain to them as they were outside the second line border. At this point, Shenzhen has five districts: Luohu, Futian, Nanshan, Bao'an, and Longgang. In March 1998, Shenzhen's government created the Yantian District from the eastern portions of the Luohu District (the original area of the Shatoujiao Management District), and within the second line border. Yantian, Luohu, Futian, and Nanshan together as the special economic districts within the second line border are referred to as guannei while districts that are outside the second line and do not have special economic privileges such as Bao'an and Longgang are referred to as guanwai. The Shenzhen government later established two new districts as part of the guanwai: Guangming New District in August 2007 and Pingshan New District in June 2009.

On 1 July 2010, the second line border was dissolved, and the Shenzhen SEZ was expanded to cover the entire city. Therefore, the four guanwai districts Bao'an District, Longgang District, Guangming New District, and Pingshan New District, would be given special economic privileges like the guannei districts. Since June 2015, the existing unused border structures have been demolished and are being transformed into urban greenspaces and parks. On 15 January 2018, the State Council approved the removal of the barbed wire fence set up to mark the boundary of the SEZ.

In early 2011, the provincial government of Guangdong approved the establishment of the Shenzhen-Shantou Special Cooperation Zone in the city and SEZ of Shantou, Guangdong that will last until 2040 with the purpose of economic development. The zone would be managed by Shenzhen and another Cantonese city, Shanwei. The zone is under the jurisdiction of Shenzhen instead of Shantou, with residents living there considered to be permanent residents of Shenzhen.

The Shenzhen government later established two new districts on 27 October 2011, Longhua New District and Dapeng New District. With approval of the State Council, Shenzhen re-organized Longhua New District as Longhua District and Pingshan New District as Pingshan District on 11 October 2016 and Guangming New District as Guangming District on 24 May 2018, therefore becoming their own jurisdictions.

Economy

Shenzhen was the first of the Special Economic Zones (SEZ) to be established by general secretary Deng Xiaoping. Back to Apr 1979, Shenzhen was reformed as a Special Export Zone to create a favorable investment environment and introduce advanced technology and management experience, later renamed to Special Economic Zone in May 1980. As of 2018, Shenzhen has a nominal GDP of 2.42 trillion RMB (HK$2.87 trillion), which recently had surpassed neighboring Hong Kong's GDP of HK$2.85 trillion and Guangzhou's GDP of 2.29 trillion RMB (HK$2.68 trillion), making the economic output of Shenzhen the third largest out of Chinese cities, trailing behind Shanghai and Beijing. In addition, Shenzhen's GDP growth between 2016 and 2017 of 8.8% surpassed that of Hong Kong and Singapore, with 3.7% and 2.5% respectively. With a market capitalization of US$2.5 trillion as of 30 November 2018, the Shenzhen Stock Exchange (SZSE) is the 8th largest exchange in the world.

In the 2021 Global Financial Centres Index, Shenzhen was ranked as having the 8th most competitive and largest financial center in the world and 6th in the whole of Asia & Oceania region (after Shanghai, Hong Kong, Singapore, Beijing, and Tokyo). As of 2020, Shenzhen is ranked as an Alpha- (global first-tier) city by the Globalization and World Cities Research Network and ranked as having the 8th most competitive and largest financial center in the world. According to Forbes, Shenzhen has the fifth-highest number of billionaires of any city in the world. Shenzhen's nominal GDP is projected to be among the world top 10 largest cities in 2035 (together with Beijing, Shanghai and Guangzhou in China) according to a study by Oxford Economics and its nominal GDP per capita will reach above US$57,000 (ranking first in mainland China) in 2030, which is comparable to Tokyo and Seoul.

Shenzhen is part of the 21st Century Maritime Silk Road that runs from the Chinese coast south to the tip of India via the Suez Canal to the Mediterranean, there to the Upper Adriatic region to the northern Italian hub of Trieste with its rail connections to Central Europe and the North Sea.

As of August 2022, Shenzhen has the eighth-most Fortune Global 500 headquarters of any city in the world and the third-most in China after (Beijing and Shanghai) within its city limits.

Industry 

Shenzhen's industry is described by its Municipal Bureau of Statistics to be upheld by its four-pillar industries: high-tech, finance, logistics, and culture. Shenzhen is also a large hub of the Chinese and global technology industry and home to a large startup ecosystem. As of 2020, the city was ranked as the 4th Fintech powerhouse in the world after (New York City, Shanghai and Beijing). Shenzhen is primarily known for its high-tech industry, which has a value of 585.491 billion RMB (US$82.9 billion) in 2015, a 13% increase compared to last year. Out of the nominal GDP of 1,750.299 billion RMB in 2015, the high-tech industry comprises 33.4% of this amount. Shenzhen is home to a number of prominent tech firms, such as telecommunications and electronics corporation Huawei, internet giant and holding conglomerate Tencent, drone-maker DJI, and telecommunications company ZTE. Other tech firms include personal computer manufacturer Hasee, radio manufacturer Hytera, consumer electronics manufacturer OnePlus, and electronic and automobile manufacturer BYD. As a result, Shenzhen is dubbed by media outlets as "China's Silicon Valley" or the "Silicon Valley of Hardware" for the world. Shenzhen ranks 28th globally by scientific research outputs as tracked by the Nature Index.
In addition to its numerous high-tech companies, Shenzhen is also home to a number of large financial institutions, such as China Merchants Bank and Ping An Insurance and its subsidiary Ping An Bank. Since the city's establishment as a SEZ, a number of foreign banks had established offices in the city, including Citibank, HSBC, Standard Chartered, and Bank of East Asia. In total, the financial industry accounts for 14.5% of the city's nominal GDP in 2015 (254.282 billion RMB), which was a 15.9% increase over the previous year. By the end of 2016, the total assets of the financial industry amounted to 12.7 trillion RMB (banking industry assets were 7.85 trillion RMB, security companies assets were 1.25 trillion RMB, and insurance industry assets were 3.6 trillion RMB), making Shenzhen's financial industry the third largest in China. In addition, Shenzhen is one of the world's top ten financial centers as of 2019, jumping five places to ninth place as determined by "variety of areas of competitiveness, including business environment, human capital, infrastructure, financial sector development and reputation."Addressing the logistics industry, courier SF Express and shipping company China International Marine Containers (CIMC) have their headquarters in Shenzhen.  The Port of Shenzhen, composed of Yantian International Container Terminals, Chiwan Container Terminals, Shekou Container Terminals, China Merchants Port and Shenzhen Haixing (Mawan port), handled a record number of containers with rising trade increased cargo shipments in 2005, ranking it as the world's fourth-busiest container port. Shenzhen's high port traffic levels combined with a high urban population make Shenzhen a large port megacity, the largest type of port-city in the world. Together, the logistics industry accounts for around 10.1% (178.27 billion RMB) of the city's nominal GDP in 2015, which was an increase of 9.4%. Shenzhen Port’s first foreign trade blockchain cargo release platform was launched recently.

On 7 December 2008, UNESCO approved Shenzhen's entrance into the Creative Cities Network, and awarded the Shenzhen the title of "United Nations Design Capital." Altogether, the cultural industry in turn contributes to 5.8% (102.116 billion RMB) of Shenzhen's economy in 2015.

In addition to the four pillar industries that was listed by the municipal government, Shenzhen also has a relatively notable real-estate industry. The real-estate industry altogether contributes to 9.2% (162.777 billion RMB) of Shenzhen's economy in 2015, which was an increase of 16.8% compared to last year. Real estate developers such as the Evergrande Group, Vanke, and China Resources Land are headquartered within the city.

As a SEZ, Shenzhen has established several industrial zones to encourage economic activities. The Shekou Industrial Zone was approved and established back on 31 January 1979 by the Central Committee of the CPC to assist in the "Hong Kong-based" economy of Shenzhen. In 1996, the State Council approved and established the  Shenzhen High-tech Industrial Development Zone, helping to develop Shenzhen's high-tech industry in areas such as electronics and information technology. In accordance to the National Plan in 2001, the Shenzhen Software Park, integrated within the High-tech Industrial Development Zone, was established for software production and assist in the development of the city's software industry. On 26 August 2010, the State Council approved the "Overall Development Plan for Qianhai Shenzhen-Hong Kong Modern Service Industry Cooperation Zone" to solidify ties between Hong Kong and Shenzhen.

Tourism 

Tourism is gradually growing as an important industry for Shenzhen. Shenzhen has been ranked second on the list of 'top 10 cities to visit in 2019' by Lonely Planet. The Shenzhen administration in its "12th Five-Year Plan for Tourism Development of Shenzhen" had focused on turning the city into an international tourist hub, with emphasis on the city's scientific, fashion, and industrial elements. The Shenzhen tourist industry is claimed by the local administration in having a strong development advantage, due to the city being one of the tier-one cities in China, as well as being known for its coastal resources, climate environment, capitalist economy, and technological innovation. In 2015, the tourism industry's total revenue was 124.48 billion RMB (US$17.6 billion), a 98.1% increase from 2010.Out of the total revenue, 28% (35 billion RMB or US$4.968 billion) came from international tourists, an increase of 56.2% from 2010. In addition, in that year, Shenzhen received 11.63 million tourists, a 51% increase from 2010.

Shenzhen has numerous tourist destinations, ranging from recreational areas such as theme parks and public parks to tall buildings. Most of the tourist attractions are part of Overseas Chinese Town (OCT), a colloquial name for parks owned by OCT Enterprises and is classified as an AAAAA scenic area by the China National Tourism Administration. These include the Window of the World, the Splendid China Folk Village, Happy Valley, OCT East, and OCT Harbour. Other theme parks include Shekou Sea World, Xiaomeisha Sea World, and the now-closed Minsk World. The city is also home to tall buildings such as the Ping An Finance Centre, KK100, and the Shun Hing Square (also known as Di Wang Tower).

Shenzhen's tourism industry is recently expanding under the "13th Five-Year Plan for Tourism Development of Shenzhen" as promoted under the Shenzhen local government. In this plan, the tourist industry plans to exceed 200 billion RMB and receive 150 million domestic and foreign tourists by 2020. Part of the plan includes organizing the tourist industry within five brands: theme parks, retail, natural recreational areas, sports, and international gatherings, as well as speeding up construction of future tourist attractions and turning Shenzhen into a Chinese hub for sports.

Retail 
Retail is an important pillar of Shenzhen's tertiary sector. Out of the added value of Shenzhen's tertiary sector of 1.42 trillion RMB (US$201 billion) in 2018, retail contributed 43% (616.89 billion RMB) of this amount, a 7.6 percent increase compared to last year (601.62 billion RMB). In addition, 10.9% of Shenzhen's FDI is directed towards the wholesale and retail sector.

Huaqiang North is one of Shenzhen's notable retail areas, being known for having one of the largest electronics markets in the world. Luohu Commercial City, a commercial complex located adjacent to Shenzhen Railway Station, is noted for having a variety of products that ranges from electronics and counterfeit goods to tailored suits and curtains. In addition to Huaqiang North and Luohu Commercial City, Shenzhen has numerous shopping malls and commercial areas, including COCO Park and its branches COCO City and Longgang COCO Park, Uniworld, Uniwalk, and Coastal City(海岸城). Shenzhen is also home to drugstore chain China Nepstar.

"Smart retail", which uses technologies such as artificial intelligence and big data in production, circulation, and sales of consumer goods, has been growing popular within enterprises in Shenzhen. Businesses in Shenzhen are encouraged to use the Internet to develop the consumer market and new retail projects would be assisted with the use of technology. In addition, the Shenzhen administration is setting up a new retail industry development fund to promote the use of "smart retail", with the intention of stimulating the economy of Shenzhen and to turn the city into a "new retail" hub.

Demographics

As of 2020, Shenzhen had a total permanent population of 17,560,000, with 5,874,000 (33.4%) of them hukou holders (registered locally). As Shenzhen is a young city, senior citizens above 60 years old took up only 5.36 percent of the city's total population. Despite this, the life expectancy in Shenzhen is 81.25 in 2018, ranking among the top twenty cities in China. The male to female ratio in Shenzhen is 130 to 100, making the city having the highest sex disparity in comparison to other cities in Guangdong. Shenzhen also has a high birth rate compared to other Chinese cities with 21.7 babies for every 10,000 of its 13.44 million population in 2019. Based on the population of its total administrative area, Shenzhen is the fifth most populous city proper in China. Shenzhen is part of the Pearl River Delta Metropolitan Region (covering cities such as Guangzhou, Dongguan, Foshan, Zhongshan, Zhuhai, Huizhou, Hong Kong, and Macau), the world's largest urban area according to the World Bank, and has a population of 78 million according to the 2020 Census.

Before Shenzhen's establishment as a SEZ in 1980, the area was composed mainly of Hakka and Cantonese people. When the SEZ was established, the city attracted migrants from all around Guangdong, including Hakka, Cantonese, and Teochew, as well as migrants from Southern and Central Chinese provinces such as Hunan, Guangxi, Jiangxi, Sichuan, and Henan. Most of these migrants live in urban villages called chengzhongcun such as Baishizhou in the Nanshan District. Shenzhen also has a notable Korean minority based in the Nanshan District and the Futian District originating from migrants moving to Shenzhen to work for South Korean companies that had branched out into the city when China had opened up.

Due to Shenzhen's population overshooting the 14.8 million population target for 2016 to 2020, the Shenzhen justice bureau on 25 May 2021 had announced it would make it harder to earn a hukou to live in the city. In regards to the registered population (hukou), Shenzhen has seen an increase of 2.178 million or 58.9% of registered residents in the city from 2015 to 2020. In regards to permanent population, the city has seen an increase of 7,136,088 or 68.46% of permanent residents in the city from 2010 to 2020, creating an average annual growth rate of 5.35%.

Religion 
According to the Department of Religious Affairs of the Shenzhen Municipal People's Government, the two main religions present in Shenzhen are Buddhism and Taoism. Every district also has Protestant churches, Catholic churches, and mosques. According to a 2010 survey held by the University of Southern California, approximately 37% of Shenzhen's residents were practitioners of Chinese folk religions, 26% were Buddhists, 18% Taoists, 2% Christians and 2% Muslims; 15% were unaffiliated to any religion. Most new migrants to Shenzhen rely upon the common spiritual heritage drawn from Chinese folk religion. Shenzhen also hosts the headquarters of the Holy Confucian Church, established in 2009.

Languages
Prior to the establishment of Special Economic Zone, the indigenous local communities could be divided into Cantonese and Hakka speakers, which were two cultural and linguistic sub-ethnic groups vernacular to Guangdong province. Two Cantonese varieties were spoken locally. One was a fairly standard version, known as standard Cantonese. The other, spoken by several villages south of Fuhua Road was called Weitou dialect. Two or three Hong Kong villages south of the Shenzhen River also speak this dialect. This is consistent with the area settled by people who accompanied the Southern Song court to the south in the late 13th century. Younger generations of the Cantonese communities now speak the more standard version. Today, some aboriginals of the Cantonese and Hakka speaking communities have dispersed into urban settlements (e.g. apartments and villas), but most of them are still clustering in their traditional urban and suburban villages.

The influx of migrants from other parts of the country has drastically altered the city's linguistic landscape, as Shenzhen has undergone a language shift towards Mandarin, which was both promoted by the Chinese Central Government as a national lingua franca and natively spoken by most of the out-of-province immigrants and their descendants. However, in recent years multilingualism has been on the rise as descendants of immigrants of out-of-province Mandarin native speakers have begun to assimilate into the local culture through friends, television and other media. Despite the ubiquity of Mandarin Chinese, according to the SCMP, some Shenzhen residents, Cantonese and non-Cantonese alike, have attempted to revive the Cantonese language as part of Shenzhen's culture.

Cityscape

In 2019, Shenzhen has been dubbed by The Guardian as "the world leader completing new skyscrapers." The city is ranked the second in the world in terms of the number of buildings above 150 meters, with 297 of them completed as of July 2021, after neighboring Hong Kong. There were more skyscrapers completed in Shenzhen in the year 2016 than in the whole of the US and Australia combined. The construction boom continues today with over 85 skyscrapers under construction across the city as of 2021, the most in the world. Most of the skyscrapers in Shenzhen were built by either Hong Kong or foreign-based architects, utilizing a modern style, though functionalism was a dominant form of architecture in the city's skyscrapers in the late 20th century. Built in 2015, the skyscraper is to be unique and elegant among its surroundings to represent the history and achievements of the main tenant: Ping An Insurance.
Shenzhen also has several historical buildings based in traditional Chinese architecture. There are Hakka walled villages located in the city such as Crane Lake and Gangeng in the Longgang District. Like typical Hakka walled villages, the architecture of Crane Lake and Gangeng are based around large thick grey walls, narrow alleyways, and courtyards. Nantou (or Xin'an) is a historic town located in the present-day Nanshan District and has some buildings that date back to the Ming Dynasty such as the Guandi Temple, though most of these traditional buildings have been replaced by modern ones. Chiwan, located in the Nanshan District, also has several historical buildings, such as the tomb to the last emperor of the Southern Song, Zhao Bing and Tianhou Temple which was built by Zheng He as an offering to Mazu to protect the Ming treasure fleet. There are also several historical forts that had defended the coastline located within the city, such as Dapeng Fortress and Chiwan Left Fort.

Education 

Before the 1980s, Shenzhen's education system was primarily based on primary and limited secondary schooling, with no residents admitted to a university. Since Shenzhen's establishment as a SEZ in the 1980s, migrants poured into the city, and jobs requiring a university education grew. Shenzhen started implementing policies that will help develop a more high-quality education system, borrowing teachers from the best schools in the country with promises of higher pay and benefits. In addition, the city started building new schools and renovating the infrastructure of its existing schools to give teachers a more comfortable environment to teach.In the mid-1980s, as upper secondary education became popular, there was a need for higher education institutions in the city. Opened in 1983, Shenzhen Normal School, later upgraded to Shenzhen Normal College, trained students to become primary school teachers. Approved by the State Council in the same year, Shenzhen University became Shenzhen's first comprehensive full-time higher educational institution. In 1999, the Shenzhen Municipal Government set up the Shenzhen Virtual University Park in the Science and Technology Park, where teachers from China's top universities taught graduate students. In 2011, the innovative Southern University of Science and Technology was established followed in 2018 by the Shenzhen Institute of Technology. Other universities have established campuses in the city, including Tsinghua University, Peking University, the Chinese University of Hong Kong, the Harbin Institute of Technology, and Moscow State University.

The 9-year compulsory education in Shenzhen is free. Secondary schools such as Shenzhen Middle School, Shenzhen Experimental School, Shenzhen Foreign Languages School, and Shenzhen High School, all of which have an on-line rate of over 90%, are dubbed as "Shenzhen's four famous schools." As of 2015, Shenzhen has 12 higher educational institutions, 335 general secondary schools, 334 primary schools, and 1,489 preschools.

According to Laurie Chen of the South China Morning Post, Shenzhen, which had 15 million people as of 2019, had not built as many primary and secondary schools for its populace as it should have, compared to similarly developed cities in China. Laurie Chen cited the acceptance rate of Shenzhen secondary schools in 2018: 35,000 slots were available for almost 80,000 applicants. She also cited how Guangzhou had 961 primary schools while Shenzhen had only 344 primary schools, as well as how Guangzhou's count of primary school teachers exceeded that of Shenzhen's by 17,000; Chen argued that Guangzhou and Shenzhen have similar populations. In response Shenzhen schools began increasing salaries for prospective teachers.

Transport

Shenzhen is the second largest transportation hub in Guangdong and South China, trailing behind the provincial capital of Guangzhou. Shenzhen has a developed extensive public transportation system, covering rapid transit, buses and taxis, most of which can be accessed by either using a Shenzhen Tong card or using QR codes generated by WeChat mini programs. Shenzhen is noted for being the first major city worldwide to only use electric buses and taxis.
Regarding air transport, Shenzhen is served by its own Shenzhen Bao'an International Airport and the neighboring Hong Kong International Airport (HKIA). Located  from the center of the city, Shenzhen Bao'an International Airport serves as the main hub for passenger airlines Shenzhen Airlines and Donghai Airlines and a main hub for cargo airlines Jade Cargo International, SF Airlines, and UPS Airlines. Together, Shenzhen Bao'an International Airport handled 49,348,950 passengers, 355,907 aircraft, and 1,218,502.2 cargo in 2018, making it the 5th busiest airport in China in terms of passenger traffic and the 4th busiest airport in the country in terms of aircraft and cargo traffic. In addition to flying through Bao'an International Airport, ticketed passengers can also take ferries from the Shekou Cruise Centre and the Fuyong Ferry Terminal to the Skypier at Hong Kong International Airport. There are also coach bus services connecting Shenzhen with HKIA.

The Shenzhen Metro serves as the city's rapid transit system. The system in 2022 reaches  of route operating on 12 lines with 290 stations. By 2030 the network is planned to be 8 express and 24 non-express lines totalling 1142 kilometres of trackage. The average daily metro ridership in 2021 is 5.99 million passengers. The metro also operates a tram system in the Longhua District.

Shenzhen is served by seven inter-city railway stations: Futian, Guangmingcheng, Pingshan, Shenzhen (also known as Luohu Railway Station) Shenzhen East, Shenzhen North, and Shenzhen West. High-speed rail (HSR) lines that go through the city are the Guangzhou–Shenzhen–Hong Kong Express Rail Link, the Beijing–Guangzhou high-speed railway, and the Xiamen–Shenzhen railway (forms part of the Hangzhou–Fuzhou–Shenzhen passenger railway). Non-HSR lines that go through Shenzhen are the Guangzhou-Shenzhen Railway (forms part of the Kowloon–Canton railway) and the Beijing-Kowloon Railway.

As of August 2019, the city's bus system encompasses over 900 lines, with a total of over 16,000 electric vehicles, the largest of its kind in the world. The system is operated by multiple companies. As at January 2019 conversion of Shenzhen's taxi fleet to electric vehicles reached 99%. Electric taxis have a blue and white colour scheme. Petroleum fuelled taxis are coloured either green or red.

Shenzhen serves as a fabric to China's expressway system. Expressways within the city include the Meiguan Expressway (part of the G94 Pearl River Delta Ring Expressway), the Jihe Expressway (part of the G15 Shenhai Expressway), the Yanba Expressway (part of the S30 Huishen Coastal Expressway), the S28 Shuiguan Expressway, the Yanpai Expressway (part of the G25 Changshen Expressway and the S27 Renshen Expressway), and the S33 Nanguang Expressway. In response to being rejected from being a part of the Hong Kong–Zhuhai–Macau Bridge, Shenzhen is constructing a bridge across the Pearl River Delta to connect the city of Zhongshan.
Shenzhen is connected with Hong Kong (city and airport), Zhuhai and Macau through ferries that leave from and arrive at the Shekou Cruise Center. The Fuyong Passenger Terminal in the Bao'an District provide services to and from Hong Kong (Hong Kong International Airport) and Macau (Taipa Temporary Ferry Terminal and Outer Harbour Ferry Terminal). The Port of Shenzhen is the third busiest container port in the world, handling 27.7 million TEUs in 2018.

Due to its proximity to Hong Kong, Shenzhen has the largest number of entry and exit ports, the largest number of entry and exit personnel, and the largest traffic volume in China. Shenzhen is busiest in China when it comes to border crossings, with people entering and exiting the country through the city and Hong Kong reaching 239 million in 2015. In the same year, a total of 15.5 million vehicles crossed the border in Shenzhen, a 0.4% increase of last year.  Border crossing ports include the Shenzhen Bay Port, Futian Port, Huanggang Port, Man Kam To Port, and Luohu Port.

Multiple ports on the part of the coastline of Shenzhen constitute the Shenzhen Port. In 2019, Shenzhen had 211 international container routes, and the container throughput of the entire Shenzhen port reached nearly 25.77 million boxes in 2019, ranking fourth in the world. Yantian Port is the busiest port among Shenzhen ports and the main foreign trade channel in South China in the mid-term.

Culture 

As Shenzhen is located in Guangdong, the city historically has a Cantonese culture before its transition to a SEZ. Migrants coming to the city to find work and opportunities have turned Shenzhen into a cultural melting pot. Despite this, the municipal government and some of the residents living in Shenzhen, including those who are not from Guangdong, have invested in keeping and reflecting off the city's Cantonese heritage. Shenzhen has presented itself as a city of opportunity for young people in China. The competitive culture that the city promotes among the youth have also used the term "Shenzhen speed," which resulted from the fast construction of the tallest building in Shenzhen. The term also describes a period of constant competition, quick changes, and high-efficiency.

In 2003, the municipal government announced plans to turned Shenzhen into a cultural city by promoting design, animation, and library construction. Shenzhen's cultural industry specializes in being one of the largest handicraft manufacturers in China, and is also an industry center for oil painting in bases such as Dafen Village. Shenzhen also hosts the Shenzhen International Cultural Fair which specializes as an expo for the world's cultural industries, with the first expo being in November 2004. As a result of these developments, Shenzhen was awarded by UNESCO the title of "United Nations Design Capital" and was accepted entry into the Creative Cities Network on 7 December 2008.

As part of turning Shenzhen into a cultural city, the municipal government established the "Library City" concept in 2003. The plan would create a library network within the city through library construction, service improvement, and create a comfortable reading environment. By the end of 2015, Shenzhen has 620 public libraries, including 3 city-level public libraries, 8 district-level public libraries, and 609 grassroots libraries. Notable libraries include the Shenzhen Library and the Shenzhen Children's Library. Shenzhen also has bookstores, with the most notable being Shenzhen Book City in the Futian District. Shenzhen has a number of museums and art galleries, such as the Shenzhen Museum, the Shenzhen Art Museum, the Shekou Maritime Museum, the Longgang Museum of Hakka Culture, the Shenzhen Museum of Contemporary Art, and the He Xiangning Art Museum. Shenzhen also has a few theaters, notably the Shenzhen Concert Hall, the Shenzhen Grand Theater, and the Shenzhen Poly Theater.

As with Hong Kong and the surrounding Guangdong province, the main cuisine of Shenzhen is Cantonese. However, due to the recent growth of migrants to the city, Shenzhen also hosts a diverse array of cuisines, from Chinese cuisines such as Chaozhou cuisine, Hakka cuisine, Sichuan Cuisine, Shanghai cuisine, and Xiang cuisine, as well as foreign cuisines such as Korean, Japanese, French, and American. The Yantian District is known for its Teochew-based and Hakka-based seafood, with restaurants lined up along the coastline.  Some recreational areas in Shenzhen such as Xianhu Botanical Garden, Donghu Park, and Xiaomeisha, host barbecues where visitors bring their own food.  Street food such as Xinjiang lamb skewers, Northern Chinese pancakes, and black sesame soups, can be found in Xijie Street and the urban village of Baishizhou. Shenzhen also has its own tea culture. In regards to food chains, first McDonald's restaurant in mainland China opened for business in Shenzhen on 8 October 1990, providing the city American fast food. Shenzhen is home to the HeyTea chain of tea shops, which provides a variety of cheese and fruit teas and is popular among social media.

Shenzhen has a prominent nightlife culture, with most of the activity centered in the entertainment complexes of COCO Park and Shekou, with the former being referred by the South China Morning Post (SCMP) as "Shenzhen's answer to Lan Kwai Fong." There are many bars and clubs in the city, mostly unregulated, that stay open till the morning. Tunnel raves, referred by the SCMP as "a Shenzhen nightlife staple", have earned a reputation in the world, though they are often cracked down by police. Police has also cracked down on prostitution and pornography, which were elements of nightlife entertainment in Shenzhen, with one of the most prominent operations being centered in Shazui in the Futian District in the mid-2000s, resulting in closures of entertainment businesses and a decrease of foreign tourists in that area of the city.

Sports

Shenzhen is home to several professional sports teams, including the Shenzhen Leopards of the Chinese Basketball Association and Shenzhen F.C. of the Chinese Super League. Other professional sports teams include Shenzhen Ledman F.C. of China League Two until the club was disbanded in 2018 and the Shenzhen KRS Vanke Rays of the Zhenskaya Hockey League.

Shenzhen is the host of several international sports events. In August 2011, the city has hosted the 26th Summer Universiade, a multi-sporting event for university students. In 2018, Shenzhen hosted a pre-season National Hockey League game between the Calgary Flames and Boston Bruins. From 2019 to 2028, Shenzhen is hosting the WTA Finals tennis tournament, which is the season-ending championship for women's tennis. Shenzhen is also one of the host cities of the 2019 FIBA Basketball World Cup. Shenzhen is also a popular destination for skateboarders from all over the world, due to the architecture of the city and its lax skate laws.

Shenzhen has several multi-purpose sports venues. Shenzhen Stadium, located in the Futian District, is home to the Shenzhen F.C. For the 2011 Summer Universiade, Shenzhen has constructed several sports venues, such as the Shenzhen Bay Sports Center in the Nanshan District and the Shenzhen Universiade Sports Centre in the Longgang District.

One of the most significant sporting events unique to Shenzhen is RoboMaster, an annual intercollegiate robot competition founded and hosted by DJI based on autonomous moving target shooting. Started in 2015, the competition introduced a 5-on-5 MOBA-style robot combat between university students around China and later the world. Rewards to the competition include a prize pool of 3,750,000 RMB and a job landing at DJI.

Environment

Parks and beaches 

Shenzhen has an extensive three-level public park system that was established in 2006, which categorizes parks as natural parks, urban parks, and community parks. By 2019, the city had 1,090 parks covering about 39,320 hectares, including 33 natural parks, 152 urban parks and 905 community parks. According to state-owned news outlet Xinhua, Shenzhen plans to build and renovate over 40 parks per year, bringing the number of parks in the city to 1,500 by 2035. 

Lianhuashan Park is located on the territory of 150 hectares in the Futian District. At the top of the mountain is a large bronze statue of Deng Xiaoping.

Wutongshan National Park is spread around the mountain of the same name in the Luohu District. From the observation deck, there is a view of the Shenzhen skyline as well as Hong Kong and the surrounding bay, and on the next peak there is a transmission tower of a local television station.

Shenzhen Bay Park, located along the city's coastline along Shenzhen Bay, opened in 2011, which included the nearby Mangrove Park. There are several thematic recreation areas and attractions, and along the 9-kilometer-long coastal strip there is an embankment. The Mangrove Ecopark was established in 2000 in the Futian District and at that time was the smallest national park in China. A large group of birds migrate to the ecopark in the mangroves on an area of 20.6 hectares in a 9-kilometer coastal zone of the Shenzhen Bay.

Shenzhen Bay Park is connected to the Dashahe Park (大沙河公园, 'big sand river'), located in Nanshan District, it follows the Dashahe River.

Other notable parks in Shenzhen include the Shenzhen Garden Flower Exposition Center, Shenzhen Safari Park, Xili Lake Resort,  and Yangtai Mountain Fountain Park.

Pollution 

During the COVID-19 pandemic, Shenzhen achieved an average air quality index (AQI) score of 44.8 µg/m³ and daily AQI score of 19 µg/m³. Out of ten Chinese mega-cities, Shenzhen recorded the lowest in average PM2.5 concentration (22.5 µg/m³), average PM10 concentration (37.7 µg/m³), average carbon monoxide concentration (0.6 µg/m³), and average nitrogen dioxide concentration (21.9 µg/m³). Swiss environmental technology company IQAir attributed most of the pollution in Shenzhen to stem from the engineering industry, continued use of coal, and traffic.

In 2014, Shenzhen experienced severe water pollution in the city's rivers and waterways, with 173 of the 310 rivers considered to be in "critical" condition and four rivers: the Maozhou, Guanlan, Longgang and Pingshan Rivers, to be the most polluted out of all rivers in the Pearl River Delta. The pollutants in the river consisted mainly of ammonia, phosphorus, and nitrogen. As a result, the city had conducted a campaign to restore the city's rivers by building more water pipes and sewage treatment plants.

Environmental protection 

From 2000 to 2014, Shenzhen spent 30 billion RMB to restore the city's rivers from water pollution, which some were considered at the time to be the most polluted in the Pearl River Delta. The city had constructed 33 sewage treatment plants and laid almost  of sewage pipes. By 2020, the city laid an additional  of water pipelines and completed 13,793 pipeline renovation projects in urban villages and housing estates.

In 2009, Shenzhen was chosen as one of thirteen cities to pilot a national new-energy vehicle program. In 2017, Shenzhen offered 3.3 billion RMB in subsidies in electric buses and the construction of charging facilities. In mid-2018, the city made major headlines for being the first city to roll an all-electric public bus fleet. In the same year, more than half of the city's taxi fleet are electric, with the goal to turn the fleet all-electric. By early 2019, Shenzhen rolled out an all-electric taxi fleet, with 99% of taxis now electric-powered.

In late 2019, Shenzhen launched a garbage classification program in which waste is to be sorted in four categories: recyclables, kitchen waste, hazardous waste, and other waste. Residents who follow the guidelines will be given cash while those who don't would be fined by the government.

Media

In Shenzhen there are 14 newspapers, one comprehensive publishing house, three video-audio products publishing houses, 88 bureaus of inland and Hong Kong media organizations, 40 periodicals, and about 200 kinds of in-house publications of which the majority belong to enterprises. The most prominent media companies in Shenzhen are the Shenzhen Media Group, the Shenzhen Press Group, China Entertainment Television (CETV), and Phoenix Television branch iFeng.

 (sznews.com) is a Chinese-language newspaper owned by the Shenzhen Press Group that serves as Shenzhen's main online news source. Shenzhen Daily is an English-language news outlet for Shenzhen covering local, national and international news. That's Shenzhen is the Shenzhen edition of That's PRD, an English-language media company with an online, print and social footprint. ShekouDaily.com is an online media outlet providing news and resources focusing on the Shekou sub-district in Nanshan District of Shenzhen.

Relations with Hong Kong 

The area encompassed by Shenzhen and Hong Kong was formerly belonged to Bao'an County in imperial times. After the Qing defeat in the Second Opium War, the United Kingdom seized Hong Kong Island and was leased the New Territories, forming the modern-day boundaries between Hong Kong and Shenzhen (the successor to Bao'an). The two cities are separated by two bays: Shenzhen Bay and Mirs Bay, and a river: Sham Chun River. According to then-Executive Council member Leung Chun-ying, the two cities' close relationship can be due to the close distance between the two, similar economic systems, differences in wages and price levels, and that the two cities have different systems compared to other Chinese cities, with Hong Kong embracing the one country, two systems principle while Shenzhen is a SEZ.

From the establishment of Shenzhen as a SEZ in 1980 to 2007, Hong Kong has been Shenzhen's largest trade partner, with exports to Hong Kong accounted for 46.6% of Shenzhen's total exports. In 2015, the total import and export volume of Shenzhen Port to Hong Kong was 1.1 trillion RMB. Both cities had established the Qianhai Shenzhen-Hong Kong Modern Service Industries Cooperation Zone within the Nanshan District which is a free-trade zone that mirrors the economic policies of both cities and to bring Hong Kong closer to Mainland China. Tencent estimated that by 2020, Qianhai is expected to create a total output value of 150 billion RMB, with an output of 10 billion RMB per square kilometer. As of 23 February 2021, Qianhai has a total of 11,325 firms from Hong Kong.

As of September 2016, there are nine crossing points on the boundary between Shenzhen and Hong Kong, among which six are land connections. From west to east these include the Shenzhen Bay Port, Futian Port, Huanggang Port, Man Kam To Port, Luohu Port and Shatoujiao Port. On either sides of each of these ports of entry are road and/or rail transportation.

Sister cities
Shenzhen has been very active in cultivating sister city relationships. In October 1989, Shenzhen Mayor Li Hao and a delegation travelled to Houston to attend the signing ceremony establishing a sister city relationship between Houston and Shenzhen. Houston became the first sister city of Shenzhen. As of 2015, Shenzhen has established sister city relationship with 25 cities in the world.
, Shenzhen is twinned with the following regions, cities, and counties:

  Houston, United States, March 1986
  Brescia, Italy, November 1991
  Brisbane, Australia, June 1992
  Poznań, Poland, July 1993
  Kingston, Jamaica, March 1995
  Lomé, Togo, June 1996
  Nuremberg, Germany, May 1997
  Walloon Brabant, Belgium, October 2003
  Tsukuba, Japan, June 2004
  Gwangyang, South Korea, October 2004
  Johor Bahru, Malaysia, July 2006
  Perm, Russia, 2006
  Turin, Italy, January 2007
  Timișoara, Romania, February 2007
  Hull, United Kingdom
  Rotherham, United Kingdom, November 2007
  Luxor, Egypt, 6 September 2007
  Reno, Nevada, United States, 30 April 2008
  Samara, Russia, 19 December 2008
  Montevideo, Uruguay February 2009
  Kalocsa, Hungary, 2011
  Haifa, Israel, 2012
  Barcelona, Spain, July 2012
  Apia, Samoa, August 2015
  Edinburgh, United Kingdom, June 2019

Other twinnings 
The Shenzhen Port is twinned and has collaboration agreements with:

  The Port of Santa Cruz de Tenerife, Canary Islands June 2013.

See also

 Index of Shenzhen-related articles
 Administrative divisions of the People's Republic of China
 Economy of China
 List of twin towns and sister cities in China
 Pearl River (China)
 Puxin Biogas

References

Further reading
  - First published on 2010 July 20.
  - Published online on May 16, 2013. Also see working paper titled:  - Profile at ResearchGate and profile at Semantic Scholar
 
  - Received on October 12, 2018, accepted for publication on January 7, 2019, and published on January 16, 2019
  - Published online on 21 October 2010.
 
 
 - First published on December 22, 2009

External links

 Shenzhen Government Online
 ShekouDaily: English Language News and Resources
 

 
Pearl River Delta
Prefecture-level divisions of Guangdong
Special Economic Zones of China
Sub-provincial cities in the People's Republic of China
Planned cities in China
Socialist planned cities
Populated places with period of establishment missing